Hymenostegia gracilipes is a small to medium riparian and rainforest tree in the family Fabaceae. It is endemic to Ghana, where it is threatened by habitat loss due to its growth in primary rainforests, although it is locally common.

References

Detarioideae
Endemic flora of Ghana
Endangered flora of Africa
Trees of Africa
Taxonomy articles created by Polbot